Lophostethus dumolinii is a moth of the family Sphingidae. It is known from most habitats, except desert and high mountains throughout the Ethiopian Region, excluding Madagascar and the Cape in South Africa.

The length of the forewings is 55–70 mm for males and 70–75 mm for females and the wingspan is 130–171 mm. This species has a characteristic colour and pattern of the upperside of the thorax and forewing. The forewing upperside ground colour is pale brown with paler undulating antemedian and postmedian lines.

The larvae feed on Ficus, Milletia aboensis, Hibiscus tiliaceus, Hibiscus micranthus, Hibiscus panduriformis, Dombeya rotundifolia, Dombeya cymosa, Carissa macrocarpa, Andersonia, Grewia bicolor and Grewia occidentalis. The larvae are entirely different in appearance from the other species of the family Sphingidae in that they possess spines on their body while most larvae are sleek and smooth.

Subspecies
Lophostethus dumolinii dumolinii
Lophostethus dumolinii carteri - Rothschild, 1894 (western Africa)
Lophostethus dumolinii congoicum - Clark, 1937 (Congo, Uganda)

References

Smerinthini
Moths described in 1849
Moths of Africa